Sutter County is a county located in the U.S. state of California. As of the 2020 census, the population was 99,633. The county seat is Yuba City. Sutter County is included in the Yuba City, CA Metropolitan Statistical Area as well as the Sacramento-Roseville, CA Combined Statistical Area. The county is located along the Sacramento River in the Sacramento Valley.

History
The Maidu were the people living in the area of Sutter County when European settlers arrived.

Sutter County was one of the original counties of California, created in 1850 at the time of statehood. Parts of the county were given to Placer County in 1852.

Sutter County is named after John Augustus Sutter, a German native born to Swiss parents. He was one of the first Europeans to recognize the Sacramento Valley for its potential in agriculture. His Hock Farm, established in 1841 on the Feather River just south of present-day Yuba City, was the site of the first major farm in the Central Valley, and used extensive slave labor from Natives in order to function.

Sutter obtained the Rancho New Helvetia Mexican land grant, and called his first settlement New Helvetia (which included the present day city of Sacramento). In 1850, Sutter retired to Hock Farm when the gold rush led to him losing his holdings in Sacramento.

Sutter County is the birthplace (Yuba City, 1858) of John Joseph Montgomery, who was the first American to successfully pilot a heavier-than-air craft, 20 years before the Wright Brothers, and who held the first patent for an "aeroplane."

In the 1890s, Sutter County was one of the two prohibition counties in California; the other was Riverside County. Both outlawed saloons and sale or consumption of alcohol in public.

Geography
It is the fourth-smallest county in California by total area. Some 88 percent of the county is prime farmland and grazing land.

Sutter County is home to the Sutter Buttes, known as the "World's Smallest Mountain Range." This volcanic formation provides relief to the otherwise seemingly flat Sacramento Valley.

Bordered by the Sacramento River on the west and the Feather River on the east, Sutter County has  of levees. The Sutter Bypass, which diverts flood waters from the Sacramento River, cuts through the heart of Sutter County.

Adjacent counties
 Butte County - north
 Yuba County - east
 Placer County - southeast
 Sacramento County - south
 Yolo County - southwest
 Colusa County - west

National protected areas
 Butte Sink National Wildlife Refuge (part)
 Sutter National Wildlife Refuge
Sutter County also has the State Feather River Wildlife Area, consisting of the Nelson Slough, O'Connor Lakes, Abbott Lake, Shanghai Bend, and Morse Road Units in Sutter County. Also, a  State Park in the Sutter Buttes. In addition, there are the state public trust lands of the Feather, Bear and Sacramento rivers as well as smaller streams including Butte Creek and Butte Slough.

Transportation

Major highways
 State Route 20
 State Route 70
 State Route 99
 State Route 113

Public transportation
Yuba Sutter Transit operates local bus service, as well as commuter runs to Downtown Sacramento.

Airports
Sutter County Airport is a general aviation airport located just south of Yuba City.

Politics

Voter registration statistics

Cities by population and voter registration

Overview 
Sutter is a strongly Republican county in presidential and congressional elections. The last Democrat to win the county was Franklin Roosevelt in 1940. It was the only county in the whole state to give a majority to George H. W. Bush in 1992.

  
  
  
  
  
  
  
  
  
  
  
  
  
  
  
  
  
  
  
  
  
  
  
  
  
  
  
  
  
  
  

On November 4, 2008, Sutter County voted 70.7% for Proposition 8 which amended the California Constitution to ban same-sex marriages.

Crime 

The following table includes the number of incidents reported and the rate per 1,000 persons for each type of offense.

Demographics

2020 census

Note: the US Census treats Hispanic/Latino as an ethnic category. This table excludes Latinos from the racial categories and assigns them to a separate category. Hispanics/Latinos can be of any race.

2011

Places by population, race, and income

2010
The 2010 United States Census reported that Sutter County had a population of 94,737. The racial makeup of Sutter County was 57,749 (61.0%) White, 1,919 (2.0%) African American, 1,365 (1.4%) Native American, 13,663 (14.4%) Asian, 281 (0.3%) Pacific Islander, 14,463 (15.3%) from other races, and 5,297 (5.6%) from two or more races.  Hispanic or Latino of any race were 27,251 persons (28.8%).

2000
As of the census of 2000, there were 78,930 people, 27,033 households, and 19,950 families residing in the county. There were 28,319 housing units at an average density of 47 per square mile (18/km2). The racial makeup of the county was 67.5% White, 1.9% Black or African American, 1.6% Native American, 11.3% Asian, 0.2% Pacific Islander, 13.0% from other races, and 4.6% from two or more races.  22.2% of the population were Hispanic or Latino of any race. 10.3% were of German, 9.0% American, 7.1% English and 6.1% Irish ancestry according to Census 2000. 70.3% spoke English, 17.9% Spanish and 9.3% Punjabi as their first language.

There were 27,033 households, out of which 37.9% had children under the age of 18 living with them, 57.0% were married couples living together, 11.7% had a female householder with no husband present, and 26.2% were non-families. 21.2% of all households were made up of individuals, and 8.6% had someone living alone who was 65 years of age or older.  The average household size was 2.87 and the average family size was 3.35.

In the county, the population was spread out, with 29.0% under the age of 18, 9.2% from 18 to 24, 28.2% from 25 to 44, 21.3% from 45 to 64, and 12.4% who were 65 years of age or older.  The median age was 34 years. For every 100 females, there were 98.0 males.  For every 100 females age 18 and over, there were 94.3 males.

The median income for a household in the county was $38,375, and the median income for a family was $44,330. Males had a median income of $35,723 versus $25,778 for females. The per capita income for the county was $17,428.  About 12.1% of families and 15.5% of the population were below the poverty line, including 21.3% of those under age 18 and 7.7% of those age 65 or over.

Media 
Sutter County is in the Sacramento television market, and thus receives Sacramento media.

MySYtv.com provides television coverage of local events in the area.

Communities

Cities
Yuba City (county seat)
Live Oak

Census-designated places

East Nicolaus
Meridian
Nicolaus
Rio Oso
Robbins
Sutter
Trowbridge

Unincorporated communities

 Abbott
 Alemandra
 Berg
 Bogue
 Catlett
 Colusa Junction
 Counsman
 Cranmore
 Cunard
 Dean Place
 Encinal
 Ensley
 Everglade
 Hinsdale
 Joes Landing
 Joesphine
 Karnak
 Kirkville
 Lira
 Lomo
 Marchant
 Mount Vernon
 Nuestro
 Oswald
 Pennington
 Pleasant Grove
 Poffenbergers Landing
 Progress
 Sanders
 Sankey
 South Yuba City
 Subaco
 Sullivan
 Sunset
 Tarke
 Tierra Buena
 Tisdale
 Tudor
 Verona
 Wilson

Proposed town
Sutter Pointe

Population ranking

The population ranking of the following table is based on the 2010 census of Sutter County.

† county seat

See also

 Hiking trails in Sutter County
List of school districts in Sutter County, California
National Register of Historic Places listings in Sutter County, California
Sutter County Library

Notes

References

External links

 
1850 establishments in California
California counties
Populated places established in 1850
Sacramento Valley
Counties in the Sacramento metropolitan area
Majority-minority counties in California